The University of the Andes (Spanish: Universidad de Los Andes, ULA) is the second-oldest university in Venezuela, whose main campus is located in the city of Mérida, Venezuela. ULA is the largest public university in the Venezuelan Andes, having one of the largest student bodies in the country.

History

ULA was initially established as a Catholic seminary on March 29, 1785 by the Bishop of Mérida, Friar Juan Ramos de Lora.  De Lora called the newly founded house of studies "Real Colegio Seminario de San Buenaventura de Mérida", or Royal Seminary College of San Buenaventura of Mérida. The school was elevated to the status of Royal University of San Buenaventura of Mérida de los Caballeros on September 21, 1810, entitling it to confer junior and senior degrees in Philosophy, Medicine, Civil and Canonical (Catholic) Law, and Theology.  Universidad de Los Andes maintained its affiliation with the Catholic Church until 1832, when the president of Venezuela, General José Antonio Páez, passed an act making it a secular institution.

Currently, Universidad de Los Andes operates two campuses in Mérida, with about a dozen faculties spread throughout the city, as well as two satellite campuses in the other Venezuelan Andean states of Tachira and Trujillo.

Academics

Universidad de Los Andes offers undergraduate programs in the arts, sciences, literature, and humanities, long and short programs, as well as courses, degrees, post-graduate professional, magisterial and doctoral programs, specializations, diplomas, etc.

Academic units

 Faculty of Architecture and Design
 School of  Architecture
 School of Industrial Design

 Faculty of Arts
 School of Performing Arts
 School of Visual Arts and Graphic Design
 School of Music

 Faculty of Science
 School of Physics
 School of Mathematics
 School of Biology
 School of Chemistry

 Faculty of Economic and Social Sciences
 School of Business Administration
 School of Accounting
 School of Economics
 School of Statistics

 Faculty of Forestry and Environmental Science
 School of Forestry
 School of Geography and Renewable Resources
 School of Forestry Engineering

 Faculty of Judicial and Political Sciences
 School of Political Sciences
 School of Criminology
 School of Law

 Faculty de Pharmacy and Bioanalysis
 School of  Bioanalysis
 School of  Pharmacy

 Faculty of Humanities and Education
 School of  Education
 School of  History
 School of  Modern Languages
 School of  Letters
 School of  Media

 Faculty of Engineering
 General Engineering School
 School of  Civil Engineering
 School of Electrical Engineering
 School of Geological Engineering
 School of Mechanic Engineering
 School of Chemical Engineering
 School of Systems Engineering

 Faculty of Medicine
 School of Nursing
 School of Medicine
 School of Nutrition

 Faculty of Dentistry
 School of Dentistry

Admission

Admission to ULA is very competitive and generally mediated through the Venezuelan Oficina de Planeacion del Sector Universitario (OPSU - Office for Higher Education Planning), which oversees grades and standardized tests for all Venezuelan students enrolled in secondary education institutions. ULA lists some of the highest high school academic index (Indice Academico de la OPSU) requirements in Venezuela.

Research
ULA is one of the universities most actively engaged in research in Venezuela, consistently ranking among the top two or three universities in Venezuela across all disciplines.  In 2009, ULA was ranked 37th out of the 437 Latin American universities and research institutes evaluated by the Ranking Iberoamericano de Instituciones de Investigacion.

Active graduate research groups include: Kinetics & Catalysis, Polymer Chemistry, Behavioral Physiology, Biotechnology, Enzimology, Parasitology, Cytology, Pharmacology, Toxicology, Analytical and Molecular Spectroscopy, Geophysics, Astrophysics, Condensed Matter Physics, Applied and Theoretical Physics, Magnetism of Solids, Urban Environmental Quality, Finance, Entrepreneurial Development,  Agricultural Management, Criminology, Comparative Politics, Environmental Geopolitics, International Politics, Ethnography, Linguistics, Semiolinguistics, Phonetics, Gender Studies, Latin American Arts and Literature, Medieval Studies, etc.

Athletic and cultural activities
ULA also houses numerous varsity athletic teams, including chess, soccer, fencing, rhythmic gymnastics, tennis, basketball, swimming, and track and field  and performing arts companies such as Ballet Estable de la ULA, Teatro (Theater) Estable de la ULA, Coral (Choir) Universitaria and Orfeon Universitario. However, ULA's athletic dominance has declined in the past decade.

The Orfeon Universitario Choir has toured Colombia, Spain, the Netherlands, France, and Germany. ULA also hosts annual ballet seasons, a chamber orchestra season and numerous theater and music festivals (classical, traditional music, jazz, chant, Christmas) open to the community.

ULA operates a local radio station, 107.7 ULA FM. It formerly operated ULA TV channel 22 before it was ordered closed in June 2017.

Rectors or University Authorities 

 Friar Juan Ramos De Lora (1782–1790)
 Luis Dionisio Villamizar (1790–1791)
 Fray Manuel Cándido De Torrijos (1791–1792)
 Hipólito De Elías González (1792–1794)
 Francisco Javier Irastorza (1794–1795)
 Juan H. Hurtado De Mendoza (1795–1802)
 Francisco Javier Irastorza (1802–1803)
 Ramón Ignacio Méndez (1806–1810)
 Buenaventura Arias (1810–1815)
 Rafael Lasso De La Vega (1815–1822)
 José De La Cruz Olivares (1822–1826)
 Esteban Arias (1826–1830)
 Ignacio Fernández Peña (1832–1834)
 Sulpicio Frías (1834–1836)
 Rafael Alvarado (1836–1838)
 Agustín Chipía (1838–1843)
 Eloy Paredes (1843)
 Rafael Alvarado (1843–1845)
 José Francisco Más y Rubí (1843–1852)
 Eloy Paredes (1852–1855)
 Ciriaco Piñeyro (1855–1858)
 Pedro Juan Arellano (1858–1862)
 Francisco Jugo (1862–1863)
 Caracciolo Parra y Olmedo (1863–1866)
 José Francisco Más y Rubí (1866–1869)
 Pedro Monsalve (1869–1872)
 Foción Febres-Cordero (1872–1875)
 José De Jesús Dávila (1875–1881)
 Gabriel Picón Febres (1881–1884)
 Pedro De Jesús Godoy (1884–1886)
 Domingo Hernández Bello (1886–1887)
 Caracciolo Parra y Olmedo (1887–1900)
 Pedro De Jesús Godoy (1900–1901)
 Asisclo Bustamante (1901)
 Nepomuceno Pagés Monsant (1902–1909)
 Ramón Parra Picón (1909–1917)
 Diego Carbonell (1917–1921)
 Gonzalo Bernal (1921–1931)
 Humberto Ruiz Fonseca (1932–1933)
 Cristóbal Beníte (1933–1934)
 Roberto Picón Lares (1934–1936)
 Víctor Manuel Pérez Perozo (1936–1937)
 Manuel Antonio Pulido Méndez (1937–1941)
 Gabriel Picón Febres (Hijo) (1941–1942)
 Humberto Ruiz Fonseca (1942–1944)
 Pedro Pineda León (1944–1945)
 Edgar Loynaz Páez (1945–1949)
 Eloy Dávila Celis (1949–1951)
 Renato Esteva Ríos (1951–1953)
 Joaquín Mármol Luzardo (1953–1958)
 Pedro Rincón Gutiérrez (1958–1972)
 Ramón Vicente Casanova (1972–1976)
 Pedro Rincón Gutiérrez (1976–1980)
 José Mendoza Angulo (1980–1984)
 Pedro Rincón Gutiérrez (1984–1988)
 Néstor López Rodríguez (1988–1992)
 Miguel Rodríguez Villenave (1992–1996)
 Felipe Pachano Rivera (1996–2000)
 Genry Vargas (2000–2004)
 Léster Rodríguez Herrera (2004–2008)
 Mario Bonucci Rossini (2008–)

Notable alumni
 Marisol Aguilera, researcher, professor

See also 

 List of colonial universities in Latin America
 University of the Andes Library Services

References

External links

 
 
 ULA TV
 Núcleo Universitario "Alberto Adriani", El Vigía
 Núcleo Universitario "Rafael Rangel", Trujillo
 Núcleo Universitario "Pedro Rincón Gutiérrez", Táchira 
 Galería de fotos de la Universidad de Los Andes
 Portal wiki de la Universidad de Los Andes
 Portal del Rectorado
 Laboratorio de Demostraciones de Física (LABDEMFI)
 Puerta a la mayoría de enlaces de la ULA
 Proyecto Alma-Mater (obras de arte en la ULA)
 Agendas del Consejo Universitario de la Universidad de Los Andes
 Oficina de Prensa ULA
 Centro de Atención al Usuario (CAU)

 
Universities in Venezuela
Educational institutions established in 1810
1810 establishments in the Spanish Empire
Buildings and structures in Mérida (state)
Buildings and structures in Mérida, Mérida